SMS V107 was a torpedo boat of the German Kaiserliche Marine. Originally ordered for the Dutch Navy from the German A.G. Vulcan shipyard as the Z-3, the ship was taken over by Germany during construction owing to the outbreak of the First World War. She was launched on 12 December 1914 and sunk by a mine in Libau harbour on 8 May 1915.

Design 

V107 was designed by Stettiner Maschinenbau A.G. Vulcan shipyard as a torpedo boat for the Dutch Navy, as part one in a class of four sister ships (Z-1 to Z-4).

Displacement was  normal and  full load.

The Dutch specified an armament of two 75 mm (3-inch) guns and four 450 mm torpedo tubes, but she was completed with an armament of two 88 mm guns and two 450 mm torpedo tubes.

History 
V107 was originally ordered by the Koninklijke Marine (Dutch Navy) as the torpedo boat Z-3 (along with her sister ships Z-1, Z-2 and Z-4), one of four  (Dutch: Very large) torpedo boats to be built by A.G. Vulcan in their Stettin, Germany (now in Poland) shipyard. The four ships were taken over while still under construction on 10 August 1914 owing to the outbreak of the First World War.  She was launched on 12 December 1914 and commissioned in  the Kaiserliche Marine (German Navy) in March 1915.

On the night of 30 April/1 May 1915, V107 and sister ship  made a sortie into the Gulf of Riga, reconnoitering the island of Ruhnu and shelling lighthouses. The German Army had begun an offensive in the Baltic as a diversion for the Gorlice–Tarnów Offensive, and after a bombardment of Russian defenses of the port of Libau by German cruisers on 7 May, the Russians evacuated the city later that day. When German naval forces entered Libau harbour on the morning of 8 May V107 struck a mine on entering the port. The explosion blew off the ship's bow and V107 sunk as a result, with one crewmember killed.

See also 
 German ocean-going torpedo boats of World War I
 Sister ships
  (ex-V105)
 
  (ex-V108)

References

Notes

Bibliography

Other sources

Further reading

External links
http://www.battleships-cruisers.co.uk/german_destroyers.htm

Ships built in Stettin
1914 ships
World War I torpedo boats of Germany
Torpedo boats of the Imperial German Navy
Ships sunk by mines
Maritime incidents in 1915
World War I shipwrecks in the Baltic Sea